Kill 'Em All is a 2017 American direct-to-video action film directed by Peter Malota, and starring Jean-Claude Van Damme, Autumn Reeser and Peter Stormare.

Plot
An unidentified man arrives at a local hospital, seriously wounded. He is taken care of by a devoted nurse, Suzanne. Things take a turn for the worse when an international gang invades the hospital to kill him.

Cast

Release

Home media
Kill 'Em All was released by Destination Films on Blu-ray, DVD, and Digital HD on June 6, 2017.

References

External links

2017 films
Films set in 2016
2017 action thriller films
American action thriller films
Yugoslav Wars films
2010s English-language films
2010s American films